"I'll Be" is a song recorded by American rapper Foxy Brown for her debut studio album, Ill Na Na (1996), featuring Brooklyn-based rapper Jay-Z. It was released as the second single from the album on March 4, 1997, by Violator and Def Jam Recordings. The song was written by Shawn Carter, Jean-Claude Olivier, Samuel Barnes, Angela Winbush, René Moore, Bobby Watson and Bruce Swedien with production by Trackmasters, and samples René & Angela's 1985 song "I'll Be Good". It was recorded at Chung King Studios in New York City, while the mixing of the track was finished at The Hit Factory. "I'll Be" is a hip hop and R&B song with explicit lyrics that revolve around sex and money.

"I'll Be" received positive reviews from music critics and was a commercial success. In the United States, it peaked at number seven on the Billboard Hot 100, becoming both Brown and Jay-Z's highest charting single at the time. On the Hot Rap Singles chart, it reached number two and also peaked within the top 40 in other countries, such as Netherlands, New Zealand and the United Kingdom. "I'll Be" was certified gold by the Recording Industry Association of America (RIAA) two months after its release. It has sold over 500,000 copies and became one of the best-selling records of 1997. To date it remains Brown's only solo top-40 single and her only single to earn a certification.

An accompanying music video was directed by Brett Ratner. "I'll Be" was nominated for Top Hot Rap Single at the 1997 Billboard Music Awards and was ranked number 52 on VH1's "100 Greatest Hip-Hop Songs" list.

Track listings
 US CD single
 "I'll Be" (LP version) – 3:00
 "I'll Be" (instrumental)
 "La Familia" (unreleased LP version)

 UK CD single
 "I'll Be" (D&A radio mix) – 3:00
 "I'll Be" (radio edit) – 2:30

 US CD maxi-single
 "I'll Be" (LP version) – 3:00
 "I'll Be" (D&A Remix) – 4:47
 "I'll Be" (Foxy Brown Mix) – 7:18
 "I'll Be" (DM Club Mix) – 8:38

Credits and personnel
Credits are adapted from the Ill Na Na album liner notes.

 Foxy Brown – vocals 
 Jay-Z – vocals, songwriter 
 Jean-Claude Olivier – songwriter
 Samuel Barnes – songwriter
 Angela Winbush – songwriter
 René Moore – songwriter
 Bobby Watson – songwriter
 Bruce Swedien – songwriter
 Trackmasters – producer, executive producer
 Chris Lighty – executive producer
 Steve Stoute – executive producer
 Mike Fronda – engineer, recording
 Bill Essex – mixer
 Tom Coyne – mastering

Charts

Weekly charts

Year-end charts

Certifications

Release history

References

1996 songs
1997 singles
Def Jam Recordings singles
Foxy Brown (rapper) songs
Jay-Z songs
Music videos directed by Brett Ratner
Song recordings produced by Trackmasters
Songs written by Angela Winbush
Songs written by Bruce Swedien
Songs written by Foxy Brown (rapper)
Songs written by Jay-Z
Songs written by Jean-Claude Olivier
Songs written by Samuel Barnes (songwriter)
Songs written by René Moore